The Roseman Covered Bridge is a historic covered bridge in Winterset, Iowa. It is prominently featured in the novel The Bridges of Madison County, as well as its film adaptation. It was built in 1883 over the Middle River, and renovated in 1992. The Roseman Covered Bridge was added to the National Register of Historic Places in 1976.

See also
List of bridges documented by the Historic American Engineering Record in Iowa
List of covered bridges in Madison County, Iowa

References

External links

The Bridges of Madison County
National Register of Historic Places – Madison County, Iowa

Road bridges in Iowa
Bridges in Madison County, Iowa
Covered bridges on the National Register of Historic Places in Iowa
Bridges completed in 1883
Tourist attractions in Madison County, Iowa
Historic American Engineering Record in Iowa
National Register of Historic Places in Madison County, Iowa
Wooden bridges in Iowa
Lattice truss bridges in the United States